Lioubov Vassilieva (Malakhova) (born 6 October 1971) is a paralympic athlete from Russia competing mainly in category T46 sprint events.

Lioubov competed in the 2000 Summer Paralympics in Sydney where as well as competing in the 100m, she won a silver medal in the 200m behind Australia's double gold medalist, Amy Winters and won a gold medal in the 400m pushing Amy into third.

References

External links 
 С любовью к спорту от Любови-чемпионки
 Краткая биография на сайте МОУ СШ 65
 Паралимпийская сборная России превзошла результат четырехлетней давности

1971 births
Paralympic athletes of Russia
Athletes (track and field) at the 1992 Summer Paralympics
Athletes (track and field) at the 1996 Summer Paralympics
Athletes (track and field) at the 2000 Summer Paralympics
Paralympic gold medalists for Russia
Paralympic silver medalists for Russia
Living people
World record holders in Paralympic athletics
Medalists at the 2000 Summer Paralympics
Medalists at the 1992 Summer Paralympics
Sportspeople from Volgograd
Paralympic medalists in athletics (track and field)
Russian female sprinters
Sprinters with limb difference
Paralympic sprinters
21st-century Russian women